Dmytrenko, sometimes transliterated Dmitrenko, is a Ukrainian surname, derived from the given name Dmitry. It may refer to:

People

Dmytrenko
 Dmytro Dmytrenko (born 1973), Ukrainian figure skater
 Mychajlo Dmytrenko (1908–1996), Ukrainian-American painter
 Hryhoriy Dmytrenko (born 1945), Ukrainian rower
 Khrystyna Dmytrenko (born 1999), Ukrainian biathlete
 Oksana Dmytrenko Platero (born 1988) Ukrainian dancer
 Ruslan Dmytrenko (born 1986), Ukrainian racewalker
 Vladyslav Dmytrenko (born 2000), Ukrainian footballer
 Volodymyr Dmytrenko (born 1995), Ukrainian footballer

Dmitrenko
 Ekaterina Dmitrenko (born 1990), Russian footballer
 Oleg Dmitrenko (born 1984), Russian footballer
 Viktor Dmitrenko (born 1991), Kazakhstani footballer

See also
 
 

Ukrainian-language surnames
Patronymic surnames
Surnames from given names